Las Varas (Spanish "the rods") may refer to:

, San Justo Department, Córdoba, Argentina
Las Varas, Madera Municipality, Mexico
Las Varas, Nayarit, Mexico
Las Varas, Saucillo Municipality, Mexico

See also
Vara (disambiguation)